Herbert Barkan Newberg (1937–1992), an American attorney, was considered one of the leading class action experts in the country. He wrote the multivolume series, Newberg on Class Actions, and was named a "Legend of the Bar" by the Philadelphia Bar association.

Early life and education 
Herbert Newberg, the son of Samuel A. and Lillian (Barkan) Newberg, was born July 18, 1937, in Philadelphia, Pennsylvania, U.S. He earned a Bachelor of Science summa cum laude at the Wharton School of the University of Pennsylvania in 1958, and Juris Doctor at Harvard Law School in 1961. 

Newberg wed Babette Josephs in 1962. Married for three decades, they had two children, a son and a daughter.

Career 
Newberg's first position was as Assistant city solicitor for Philadelphia, from 1962 to 1964. He held partnerships in several Philadelphia law firms during the next thirty years, and presented cases before the United States District Court (eastern district) of Pennsylvania, the United States Court Appeals (3d circuit), the Supreme Court of the United States, the U.S. 2nd District Court of Appeals, and District of Columbia circuits. 
Kurt Heine of the Philadelphia Daily News wrote,Newberg argued class action suits on radiation poisoning from the atomic bomb and asbestos in schools. He also volunteered for groups dedicated to safety on the streets, world peace and nuclear disarmament.

Selected publications
  
 According to the Yale Library listing, "This multi-volume treatise is considered a premier work on the law and conduct of class actions. It discusses the theory and fundamental characteristics of the class action, examining benefits, controversies, and judicial remedy."

Awards, honors 
 "Legend of the Bar", Philadelphia Bar Association: He "developed a class action law practice and obtained a national reputation as one of the leading class action experts in the country. He authored the book Newberg on Class Actions, which remains the bible in the class action field."

References

External links 
 Mental Patient Civil Liberties Project et al., Petitioners, V. Department of Public Welfare et al.: U.S. Supreme Court Transcript of Record with Supporting Pleadings

1937 births
1992 deaths
20th-century American lawyers
Harvard Law School alumni
Lawyers from Philadelphia
Trial lawyers
Wharton School of the University of Pennsylvania alumni